J. Alexander (25 July 1939 – 2 April 2019), known professionally as Mahendran, was an Indian film director, screenwriter and actor, known for his work in the Tamil film industry. Mahendran is regarded as one of the greatest film makers of Tamil cinema and has influenced several filmmakers of the generations that followed.

Mahendran entered the film industry as a screenwriter, writing scripts for nearly 26 films. He made an immediate impact with his first directional venture Mullum Malarum (1978). Mahendran's next film Uthiripookkal, based on a short story written by Pudumaipithan, firmly established him as an important filmmaker in Tamil cinema. His Nenjathai Killathe won three National Film Awards including the award for the best regional film.

He has also acted in films during the latter part of his film career, including Kamaraj (2004), Theri (2016), Nimir (2018) and Petta (2019).

Biography 
Mahendran was born on 25 July 1939 to Joseph Chelliah, a teacher and Manonmani. Mahendran did his schooling in Ilayangudi and completed his intermediate at American College, Madurai. Later he joined Alagappa Government Arts College to do a Bachelor of Arts in Economics. During his college days, he was very active in stage plays. It was during that time when M. G. Ramachandran (M.G.R.) was invited as the chief guest for the college day during which Mahendran gave a speech that directly criticized the commercial elements that existed in cinema. Impressed by his speech M.G.R. praised Mahendran and said that he could become a good critic. After completing his degree, he went to Madras to study law. Seven months after joining the course he had to discontinue due to financial concerns. He then decided to go back to Ilayangud. However, on the insistence of Karaikudi Kannappa Valliappan he joined Inamuzhakkam, a periodical as a journalist. It was during this time he met M.G.R. again and he was asked to write the screenplay of Ponniyin Selvan after the former decided to make a film based on the story. The idea of developing the screenplay into a film got delayed, and M.G.R. asked Mahendran to write a story for his drama troupe. Mahendran wrote a script titled Anaadhaigal. M.G.R. decided to make a film based in the play. He named the film Vaazhve Vaa and acted in the lead role alongside Savitri. The project got shelved after three days of shooting. Soon M.G.R. acted in a film called Kaanchi Thalaivan and he recommended Mahendran to the director to make him an assistant.

Mahendran made his breakthrough as a screenwriter for the film Naam Moovar in 1966. After the success of the film he got more offers from the same banner and worked in films like Sabaash Thambi and Panakkara Pillai, both released in the subsequent years. He also wrote the script for Nirakudam starring Sivaji Ganesan. He announced that he was working on a new film in 2014 starring newcomers, for which Ilaiyaraaja would score music. He also worked as an actor in the films Kamaraj (2004), Theri (2016), and Nimir (2018).

Mahendran died on 2 April 2019, at the age of 79.

Awards 

Filmfare Award for Best Film – Tamil – Mullum Malarum (1978)
Filmfare Award for Best Director – Tamil – Uthiripookkal (1979)
National Film Award for Best Feature Film in Tamil – Nenjathai Killathe (1980)
IIFA Utsavam Best actor for Performance in a negative role – Theri (2016)

Filmography

References

External links 
 

1939 births
2019 deaths
Film directors from Tamil Nadu
Indian Tamil people
Tamil film directors
Filmfare Awards South winners
People from Sivaganga district
20th-century Indian film directors
21st-century Indian film directors
Tamil screenwriters
Screenwriters from Tamil Nadu
20th-century Indian dramatists and playwrights
21st-century Indian dramatists and playwrights